Ugo Bardi (born 23 May 1952 in Florence, Italy) is a professor of physical chemistry at the University of Florence.

Career
Bardi is a researcher on materials for new energy sources, a contributor to the now-defunct website, "The Oil Drum".

Personal life 
Bardi was married in 1976 to his wife Grazia and is a father of two, Francesco and Donata.

Works

Books 
 
 
 
 .

Journals 
 Ugo Bardi, Andrea Atrei, Gianfranco Rovida, Initial stages of oxidation of the Ni3Al alloy: structure and composition of the aluminum oxide overlayer studied by XPS, LEIS and LEED. In: Surface Science 268, Issues 1–3, (1992), 87–97, .
 Andrea Balduccia, Ugo Bardi, Stefano Caporali, Marina Mastragostino, Francesca Soavi, Ionic liquids for hybrid supercapacitors. In: Electrochemistry Communications 6, Issue 6, (2004), 566–570, .
 Gaia Ballerini, Ugo Bardi, Roberto Bignucolo, Giuseppe Ceraolo, About some corrosion mechanisms of AZ91D magnesium alloy. In: Corrosion Science 47, Issue 9, (2005), 2173–2184, .
 Ugo Bardi, The mineral economy: a model for the shape of oil production curves. In: Energy Policy 33, Issue 1, (2005), 53–61, .
 Stefano Caporali, Alessio Fossati, Alessandro Lavacchi, Ilaria Perissi, Alexander Tolstogouzov, Ugo Bardi, Aluminium electroplated from ionic liquids as protective coating against steel corrosion. In: Corrosion Science 50, Issue 2, 2008, 534–539, .
 Ilaria Perissi, Ugo Bardi,Stefano Caporali, Alessio Fossati, Alessandro Lavacchi, Ionic liquids as diathermic fluids for solar trough collectors’ technology: A corrosion study. In: Solar Energy Materials and Solar Cells 92, Issue 4, (2008), 510–517, .
 Ugo Bardi, Peak oil: The four stages of a new idea. In: Energy 34, Issue 3, (2009), 323–326, .

See also 
 Seneca cliff
 Hubbert curve
 Club of Rome

References

External links
"Cassandra's Legacy" Ugo Bardi's blog in English
"Effetto Cassandra" Ugo Bardi's blog in Italian
ASPO Italia
The Oil Drum, Blog on Peak Oil

1952 births
Scientists from Florence
Living people
Italian physical chemists
People associated with criticism of economic growth
Academic staff of the University of Florence